Ethmia quadrinotella is a moth in the family Depressariidae. It is found in Greece, Turkey, Armenia, Syria, the Palestinian Territories, Iran, Iraq, Afghanistan, north-western Karakoram, Bahrain, Arabia, Tunisia, Algeria, Egypt, Morocco, Cape Verde and northern Sudan.

The larvae have been recorded feeding on Heliotropium undulatum.

Subspecies
Ethmia quadrinotella quadrinotella (Greece, Turkey, Armenia, Syria, Palestinian Territories, Iran)
Ethmia quadrinotella quiquenotella Chrétien, 1915 (Cape Verde, Morocco, Algeria, Egypt, northern Sudan, Arabia, Bahrain, south-western Iraq, southern Iran, Afghanistan, north-western Karakoram, Tunisia)

References

Moths described in 1861
quadrinotella
Moths of Europe
Moths of Cape Verde
Moths of Asia
Moths of Africa